Cell Host & Microbe is a peer-reviewed scientific journal published by Cell Press. The journal was first launched in March 2007 and focuses broadly on the study of microbes, with an emphasis on the interface between the microbe and its host. The journal is run by in-house editorial and production teams with full responsibility for selecting and preparing content for publication.

Microbiology journals
Cell Press academic journals
Publications established in 2007